Teen Teen (틴틴) was a South Korean boy band formed by Maroo Entertainment in 2019. The group debuted on September 18, 2019, with Very, On Top.

The unit effectively disbanded following Taeseung's departure from GHOST9.

Pre-debut
Before debut, all members participated in Produce X 101 representing Maroo Entertainment, Lee Jin-woo finished in 22nd place, Lee Woo-jin in 41st and Lee Tae-seung in 53rd.

Members
Lee Jin-woo (이진우)
Lee Tae-seung (이태승)
Lee Woo-jin (이우진)

Discography

Extended plays

References

K-pop music groups
South Korean boy bands
South Korean dance music groups
Musical groups from Seoul
Musical groups established in 2019
2019 establishments in South Korea
South Korean pop music groups